The men's team tournament for indoor hockey at the 2019 Southeast Asian Games in Philippines were held from 4 to 10 December 2019 at LB Centro Mall & Convention Center.

Squads

Results

Group stage

Medal round

Semi-finals

Final

Final standings

See also
 Indoor hockey at the 2019 Southeast Asian Games – Women's tournament

References

External links
  

Men